Ladder Bay is an anchorage on the leeward side of Saba. The bay sits directly under a set of 800 steps hand carved into the rocks locally known as "The Ladder", and prior to the opening of the road down to Fort Bay, this was the single point of entry for supplies to the island.   An abandoned Customs house sits on the lip of a cliff overlooking the bay.

In March 2017, a French-owned boat broke free of its mooring, and became stranded on the rocks in Ladder Bay. No one was aboard, and the boat was successfully salvaged a few days later.

References

Bays of the Caribbean
Landforms of Saba